Final Exam is a side-scroller video game developed by Mighty Rocket Studio for Xbox Live Arcade, PlayStation Network and Microsoft Windows. Up to 4 players can work together to survive the outbreak. Many people compared the game to a 2D version of Resident Evil Outbreak or Left 4 Dead.

Reception

Initial pre-release feedback of the game was mixed due to the fact that Mighty Rocket Studio originally intended the game as a reboot of the survival horror game Obscure. The negative feedback caused the developer to change the name of the game to Final Exam.

Upon full release, the game received "mixed or average reviews" on all platforms according to the review aggregation website Metacritic. Matt Beaudette of Hardcore Gamer said of the game, "There are better options available for those simply looking for a cheap sidescroller to play once and forget about. Those who can get invested in learning and mastering a deep combat system, however, will find a lot to like in Final Exam" Smooth Town wrote, "This is a fine starting point for whatever future holds for the Obscure franchise"; however, they noted the problems with repetitiveness and cheap boss fights.

References

External links

2013 video games
Cooperative video games
Hack and slash games
PlayStation 3 games
PlayStation Network games
Run and gun games
Side-scrolling video games
Xbox 360 games
Xbox 360 Live Arcade games
Video games developed in France
Video games featuring female protagonists
Video games with 2.5D graphics
Focus Entertainment games
Windows games